Pallikkara-II is a village in Hosdurg taluk of Kasaragod district in Kerala, India.

Demographics
As of 2011 Census, Pallikkara-II village had a population of 16,618 of which 7,756 are males and 8,862 are females. The sex ratio of the village was 1,143 higher than state average of 1,084. In Pallikkara-II, 12.6% of total population is children with age group 0-6 years. Pallikkara-II had overall literacy of 93.4% lower than state average of 94%. The male literacy stands at 96.4% and female literacy was 90.9%.

References

Villages in Kasaragod district